Liao Kuan-hao (born 7 October 1990) is a male Taiwanese badminton player. He competed at the 2014 Asian Games.

Achievements

BWF Grand Prix (1 runner-up) 
The BWF Grand Prix has two levels: Grand Prix and Grand Prix Gold. It is a series of badminton tournaments, sanctioned by the Badminton World Federation (BWF) since 2007.

Men's doubles

  BWF Grand Prix Gold tournament
  BWF Grand Prix tournament

BWF International Challenge/Series (3 titles, 3 runners-up) 
Men's doubles

  BWF International Challenge tournament
  BWF International Series tournament
  BWF Future Series tournament

References

External links 
 

Living people
1990 births
People from Yunlin County
Taiwanese male badminton players
Badminton players at the 2014 Asian Games
Asian Games bronze medalists for Chinese Taipei
Asian Games medalists in badminton
Medalists at the 2014 Asian Games
21st-century Taiwanese people